Bale (Amharic: ባሌ), also known as Bali, is the name of two former polities located in the southeastern part of modern Ethiopia.

Topography 

Arid plains, highland plateaus, woodlands, and mountain ranges are all part of Bale's diversified topography. There are many climates and ecosystems, which produce a wide range of flora and fauna, including numerous endemic species. The Wabe Shebelle River, which marks Bale's northern boundary, has carved out numerous deep canyons that serve as physical barriers to the surrounding regions. Bale is divided from the southern Guji and Borana regions by the Genale River, which forms part of the southern boundary. Other important rivers in the area include the Weib, Welmel, and Dumal.

History of Bale 
Bale was a Muslim kingdom part of the Zaila confederate states under Sultanate of Showa however later in the centuries it became involved in a tug of war between the rising Christian Solomonic dynasty and Muslim states in the region. In the 14th century it was located between Ifat and Solomonic tributary state of Hadiya. Taddesse Tamrat locates Bale south of the Shebelle River, which separated the kingdom from Dawaro to the north and Adal to the northeast; Richard Pankhurst adds that its southern boundary was the Ganale Dorya River.  Ulrich Braukämper, after discussing the evidence, states that this former dependency "occupied an area in the northeast of the province which later was named after it, between the mountain range of Urgoma and the eastern Wabi Bend." Bale was Part of the Sultanate of Bale.

This kingdom's earliest surviving mention is in the Soldiers Songs of Emperor Amda Seyon I. The historian Chihab al-Umari described its size as 20 days travel by six days travel, and its lands were more fertile and with a better climate than its Muslim neighbors. It had an army of 18,000 horsemen and "many" foot soldiers.

While the Muslim Kingdom of Bale was the first territory under the Ethiopian Emperor Imam that Ahmad Gragn conquered after the Battle of Shimbra Kure, Emperor Geladewos quickly reconquered it after the Imam's death. However, the territory eventually became the possession of the Oromo people, who had begun settling there as early as the Mudana gadaa (1530-1538). Amharas efforts to reconquer Bale ended when Fasil, brother of Emperor Sarsa Dengel, was killed with all of his people by the Oromo Kingdom. Following a failed rebellion against his brother in 1567, Fasil had fled there apparently believing that the southern boundaries would serve him as a power base. Sarsa Dengel, during his successful campaign against the ruler of Harar, advanced as far as the Shabelle, but the Oromo had meanwhile migrated further north into the Amhara ruled  empire behind his back. Although the Royal chronicle of Emperor Susenyos reports that Dagano, the governor of Bale had paid tribute to Emperor Yaqob, Braukämper concludes that "from the entirety of the historical situation that Ethiopia's claim to sovereignty later in the seventeenth century was purely theoretical." 

In the eighteenth century, Emir Abd-Shakur built a mosque in Bale.
Bale was considered the domain of the Emirate of Harar until Menelik's conquest of the kingdom in 1887 and consequently became incorporated into modern Ethiopia from thereon.

The province of Bale 

The later Bale, named for the earlier one, was a province in the south-eastern part of Ethiopia, with its capital city at Bale Robe. It was created in 1960 out of the province of Harerge south of the Shebelle. 

Beginning in 1963, Waqo Gutu led a rebellion which at one point involved all of Bale. The Ethiopian military was not able to put it down until 1969.  Waqo Gutu did not offer his surrender until February of the following year, and afterward was granted a commission in the Ethiopian Army.

With the adoption of the constitution in 1995, Bale was divided between the Oromia and Somali Regions of Ethiopia.

See also
Bale Zone

Notes

Provinces of Ethiopia
States and territories disestablished in 1995
States and territories established in 1960